"Sleepless Nights" is a song written by Felice and Boudleaux Bryant first sung by the Everly Brothers, in 1960, whose arrangement is the basis for every cover.

Covers
Berna-Dean  	  Imperial  USA	1963
Jerry Byrd 	  Monument  USA	1963
Emmylou Harris 	  Reprise (LP: Pieces of the Sky) USA 1975
The Judds  	  Curb / RCA  USA	1989
Patty Loveless Saguaro Road USA 2008
Peter & Gordon 	  Capitol (LP: I Go to Pieces)  1965
Eddie Vedder (featuring Glen Hansard) from his album Ukulele Songs Monkeywrench USA 2011
Emmylou Harris       Reprise USA 1975
Gram Parsons         A&M Records 1976
The Mekons from their album Honky Tonkin' Sin Record Company, Twin/Tone Records 1987
Elvis Costello       Almo Sounds 1999

Other songs by the same title
Billy Fury 	  Decca  UK	1961
The Ravens [Connecticut]  	  Haven [CT]  USA	1965
Berna-Dean  	  Imperial  USA	1963
Wayne Cochran And The C. C. Riders  	  Epic  USA	1972
Sonny and Sean  	  Pye  UK	1966
Buddy Thompson  	  Foothill  USA

References

1960 songs
The Everly Brothers songs
Songs written by Felice and Boudleaux Bryant